Mitra Farazandeh (born ) is an Iranian disability activist and visual artist.

Biography 
Mitra Farazandeh was born in Iran, she has a physical deformity. She lives in a village in Hashtpar (also known as the city of Talesh) in the Gilan province of Iran.

Farazandeh has advocated for the visibility of sexual desire of women with disabilities. She writes about not feeling human due to her physical disability and struggling to recognize a need for love; and how her physical body has created false perceptions of her not having sexual needs. She earns a living by selling her drawings and paintings.

In 2018, Farazandeh is on the BBC's 100 Women award list of the most inspiring and influential women in the world.

See also 

 Disability rights movement

References 

Living people
1976 births
Iranian activists
Iranian women's rights activists
Iranian women artists
BBC 100 Women
Iranian disability rights activists
Iranian people with disabilities